Rafael Eduardo Isea Romero (born 18 February 1968, Maracay) is a Venezuelan politician, and Governor of Aragua State from 2008 to 2012. A graduate of the Venezuelan Military Academy (1989), he participated in Hugo Chávez' February 1992 Venezuelan coup d'état attempt. From 2001 to 2004 he was Venezuela's representative to the Inter-American Development Bank. In the 2005 parliamentary elections he was elected to the National Assembly of Venezuela. In 2007 he was named deputy Minister of Finance, and in 2008, Minister of Finance of Venezuela, before being elected Governor of Aragua in the 2008 regional elections, beating PODEMOS' Henry Rosales.

Political persecution

He moved to the United States in September 2013, after he became the target of some government authorities involved in the trafficking of drugs and money laundering to the United States. After this Mr. El Aissami accused Mr. Isea of corruption and personally conducted an investigation and presented fabricated evidence. The Attorney General at the time, Luisa Ortega, allowed Mr. El Aissami as governor to manage a team of prosecutors for this case, which is illegal. Without a guarantee of an impartial, fair, and legal trial, Mr. Isea decided to remain in the US, until the government changes and have the opportunity to demonstrate his innocence. His family has also been targeted by the Venezuelan government, when in June 2015, SEBIN agents detained Rosario Romero and Raiza Isea, mother and sister of Rafael Isea, as measured retaliation ordered by Tareck El Aissami, governor of Aragua state at that time, trying to force Rafael Isea to return to Venezuela to surrender to the Chavista justice. It is important to note that Mr. Tareck El Aissami has been indicted in the United States on charges of drug trafficking and links with terrorist organizations and has been included in the ICE Most Wanted List.

Rafael Isea lives in the United States with his wife and children. He works as an Amazon courier.

References

External links
  Official blog

Living people
1968 births
Governors of Aragua
People from Maracay
Fifth Republic Movement politicians
Members of the National Assembly (Venezuela)
Finance ministers of Venezuela
Government ministers of Venezuela
United Socialist Party of Venezuela politicians
People of the 1992 Venezuelan coup d'état attempts